Fernando de Toro wasborn the 13th of January  1950 in Santiago / Chile.<ref>

Fernando de Toro is a Full Professor in the Department of English, Film and Theatre at the University of Manitoba, Winnipeg, Manitoba, Canada. He was for five years Dean of the Faculty of Graduate Studies in the same university (Winnipeg, Manitoba, Canada). De Toro published in diverse fields: literary theory, semiotics, comparative literature, post-modernity and post-coloniality, Latin American literature and Western Literatures.

Some of his publications include:

 Brecht en el teatro latinoamericano contemporáneo (Ottawa: Girol, 1984; Buenos Aires: Editorial Galerna, 1987)
 Semiótica del teatro (Buenos Aires, Galerna, 1987)
 Theatre Semiotics (Toronto/Frankfurt am Main: Toronto University Press and Vervuert Verlag, 1995)
 Intersecciones (Frankfurt am Main, Vervuert Verlag, 1999)
 Explorations in Post-Theory (Frankfurt am Main, Vervuert Verlag, 1999)
 Borders and Margins (Frankfurt am Main, Vervuert Verlag, 1999)
 New Intersections (Frankfurt am Main, Vervuert Verlag)
 Intersecciones II (Buenos Aires: Galerna, 2002).
Semiotica del Teatro, Nueva edicion revisada y aumentada, 2010
Intersecciones III (Buenos Aires, Galerna, 2012)
Inter

He published over one hundred refereed articles and delivered over four hundred lectures and international seminars. In the last years he worked in a project on the "Epistemological Foundations of Modern and Postmodern Architecture", a collaborative project with the Universidad Iberoamericana in Mexico City on the "Post-Modern Condition in Mexico: architecture, theatre, literature, music, and painting." and completing a book entitled Intersecciones III: Globalisation and Culture: Essays on Architecture, Painting, Music, LiteratUre and Theatre to be published in Editorial Galerna.

References

De Toro, Fernando
Academic staff of the University of Manitoba
Canadian educators
Living people
Year of birth missing (living people)